A special election for Arizona's 8th congressional district was held in 2018 subsequent to the resignation of Republican U.S. Representative Trent Franks. Governor Doug Ducey called a special primary election for Tuesday, February 27, 2018, and a special general election for the balance of Franks' eighth term for Tuesday, April 24, 2018.

Republican nominee and former Arizona Senate president pro tem Debbie Lesko won a closer-than-expected race against Democratic challenger Hiral Tipirneni.

Background
Incumbent Representative Trent Franks announced on December 7, 2017, that he would resign effective January 31, 2018, after admitting allegations regarding the issue of surrogacy. However, after his wife was hospitalized, Franks resigned effective December 8, 2017.

Candidates must file nomination forms and petitions within 30 days of the Governor's proclamation. Candidates in special congressional elections in Arizona must collect a number of valid signatures equal to at least one-fourth of 1% of the number of qualified signers in the district. For the 2018 special election, a Democratic candidate requires 665 signatures, a Green candidate requires 392 signatures, a Libertarian candidate requires 401 signatures, a Republican candidate requires 860 signatures, and an Independent candidate requires 4,680 signatures.

It was initially thought that Arizona's resign-to-run law would have required sitting members of the Arizona Legislature to resign their seats in order to run in the special election. Arizona's resign-to-run law does not require someone to resign if they file to run when they are in the final year of their term. However, the deadline to submit nominating petitions will be January 10 and the end of the current term for members of the Arizona Legislature is January 14, 2019. However, legal advice from the legislature's nonpartisan counsel stated that incumbent state legislators would not be required to resign in order to run in the special election.

Republican primary
Two of the major candidates in the Republican primary drew controversy late in the campaign. Former state senator Steve Montenegro faced calls to withdraw, including by former Governor Jan Brewer, after news articles revealing sexually suggestive text messages between Montenegro and a legislative staffer surfaced. Additionally, complaints were filed against former state senator Debbie Lesko over her campaign finance records.

Candidates

Declared
 Chad Allen, health care executive
 Brenden Dilley, author, entrepreneur and host of Your Voice America
 Stephen Dolgos, independent candidate for Arizona's 8th congressional district in 2012 and 2014
 Debbie Lesko, former State Senator
 Phil Lovas, former State Representative, Arizona State Chairman of Donald Trump's 2016 campaign, and Regional Advocate for the Small Business Administration's Office of Advocacy.
 David Lien, teacher and former Willmar, Minnesota council member
 Richard Mack, teacher and former Graham County Sheriff
 Steve Montenegro, former State Senator
 Bob Stump, former Arizona Corporation Commissioner
 Christopher Sylvester, Navy veteran
 Clair Van Steenwyk, radio host and candidate for the seat in 2016
 Mark Yates

Withdrew
 Kevin Cavanaugh, former deputy sheriff

Declined
 Clint Hickman, Maricopa County Supervisor
 Kimberly Yee, State Senator and candidate for State Treasurer in 2018

Endorsements

Debates
  Includes video of debate, January 24, 2018.

Polling

with Clint Hickman and Kimberly Yee

Results

Democratic primary

Candidates

Declared
 Hiral Tipirneni, emergency department physician
 Brianna Westbrook, political activist and LGBTQ community leader

Declined
 Robert Schuster, Arizona State University student
 Robert Olsen

Results

Green primary

Candidates

Declared
 Richard Grayson (write-in), candidate in Green Party presidential primary in Arizona in 2012
 Gary Swing (write-in), Green Party candidate for U.S. Senator in Arizona in 2016

Each candidate received 13 write-in votes in the primary. Neither was placed on the special election ballot.

Libertarian primary

Candidates

Declared
 Kelly Noble (write-in)
The candidate received 22 write-in votes in the primary and was not placed on the special election ballot.

General election

Republican candidate Debbie Lesko received over $1 million in funding from Republican groups outside the state.

Candidates
 Debbie Lesko (Republican), former State Senator
 Hiral Tipirneni (Democratic), emergency department physician

Debates

Predictions

Endorsements

Polling

Results

See also
 United States House of Representatives elections in Arizona, 2018#District 8
 Arizona's 8th congressional district

References

External links
 Video of March 26, 2018 debate, Arizona PBS
Official Campaign Websites
 Debbie Lesko (R) for Congress
 Hiral Tipirneni (D) for Congress

2018 16
Arizona 8
Arizona 2018 8
Arizona 2018 8
8th congressional district special election
United States House of Representatives 2018 8